Associazione Sportiva Dilettantesca Cedial Lido dei Pini (abbreviated as Cedial or Lido dei Pini) is an Italian football club based in Rome.

Background
A.S.D. Lido dei Pini plays in the Serie D, the fourth level of Italian football. The club was founded in 2007. The stadium is able to accommodate 200 spectators. It is a small stadium with a synthetic playing surface and seating for 200 people. The land is located in the central part of Italy, Lazio. It is very close to the training complex of A.S. Roma.

Season to season

References

Serie D
Football clubs in Italy